Daski may refer to:
 Daski, Lirdaf